Tracunhaém is a city located in the state of Pernambuco, Brazil. Located  at 63 km from Recife, capital of the state of Pernambuco. Has an estimated (IBGE 2020) population of 13,813 inhabitants.

Geography
 State - Pernambuco
 Region - Zona da mata Pernambucana
 Boundaries - Nazaré da Mata   (N);  Paudalho   (S);  Araçoiaba and Itaquitinga  (E); Carpina   (W)
 Area - 116.66 km2
 Elevation - 120 m
 Hydrography - Goiana and Capibaribe rivers
 Vegetation - Subcaducifólia forest
 Climate - Hot tropical and humid
 Annual average temperature - 24.9 c
 Distance to Recife - 63 km

Economy
The main economic activities in Tracunhaém are based in commerce and agribusiness, especially sugarcane; and livestock such as poultry, cattle and pigs.

Economic indicators

Economy by Sector
2006

Health indicators

References

Municipalities in Pernambuco